Project Vamp was a U.S. Navy project for the U.S. Hydrographic Office, which consisted of a special coastal survey along the Virginia and Massachusetts shores during 1954 and 1955.

Oceanography